The Sicily national football team (Sicilian: Naziunali Siciliana di Palluni) is the representative football team of the island of Sicily. It is controlled by the Sicilia Football Association and is also colloquially referred to with the name Naziunali Siciliana. The Sicilia F.A. was founded in 2020.

It is not affiliated with either FIFA or UEFA and is therefore not allowed to participate in either the FIFA World Cup or the UEFA European Championship. However, since June 2021 the Sicilia F.A. is associated with the CONIFA, therefore the team can participate in the CONIFA World Football Cup and in the CONIFA European Football Cup.

History 
In the past, the idea of creating a Sicilian national team has been already proposed by some journalists and Sicilianist circles.

The current project started in 2019 following the first contacts with CONIFA. The project was born thanks to the synergy of a Founding Committee from the three metropolitan cities of Sicily: Palermo, Catania and Messina. The official foundation of the Sicilia F.A. dates back to 15 May 2020, while the public activities were launched in 2021.

At the foundation Salvatore Mangano from Messina was chosen as President, Angelo Priolo and Fabio Petrucci from Palermo as Vice-president and General Secretary, while Alberto L'Episcopo from Catania – a former Manager of the Serie A team Chievo Verona – is the General Manager. Mario Bonsignore – former President of A.C. Ancona, Manager of F.C. Messina and Marketing Manager of the Malta Football Association – is the General Consultant of the Sicilia F.A. Pietro Cannistrà and Benedetto Bottari – protagonists of the S.S. Milazzo’s promotion to the Lega Pro – are respectively Head of the Sporting Area and Team Manager.

One of the main goals of the Sicilia F.A. is the promotion of the Sicilian national identity through football. Indeed, the initiative of the Sicilian national football team is based on the idea that Sicily represents a stateless nation with its own geographical peculiarities, history, language and culture. The Sicilia F.A. has already signed partnerships with the "Accademia della Lingua Siciliana" ("Academy of the Sicilian Language") and the Cultural Association "Lu Statutu" in order to realize its goal.

Very soon, the birth of the Sicilia F.A. inspired the fantasies of the media about the international players that theoretically could wear the jersey of the team, from Mario Balotelli to Vincenzo Grifo.

The first two football associations that acknowledged the Sicilia F.A. were the national football teams of Sardinia and Corsica.

The Global Executive Committee of the CONIFA accepted Sicily as a member association on 27 June 2021.

The Sicilia F.A., with a futsal selection, is one of the six participants to the 2021 CONIFA No Limits Mediterranean Futsal Cup.

Colours and logo 

The official colours of the Sicilian national football team are red and yellow, like the flag of Sicily.

The logo of the Sicilia F.A. is based on the flag of the Sicilian Vespers and contains the motto “Animus Tuus Dominus”, used by the Sicilian rebels during the anti-Angevin revolution.

Kits 
The Sicilia F.A. announced three football jerseys, all dedicated to the history of Sicily.
1st: "Vèspiru": red and yellow with the emblem of the Sicilian Triskelion, in honour of the Sicilian Vespers (1282); 
2nd: "Fidiricu": white with 4 red and yellow stripes and a Swabian eagle, in honour of the royal flag established by King Frederick III of Sicily in 1296;
3rd: "Ruggeru": blue with a red and white checkered stripe, in honour of the foundation of the Kingdom of Sicily by Roger II in 1130.

EYE Sport is the official kit supplier of the Sicily national football team.

Managers 
 2022– : Giovanni Marchese

Players

Current squad 
Below is the list of players called by coach Giovanni Marchese for the friendly match against Sardinia on 10 June 2022 .
Caps, goals and numbers as per 10 June 2022.

Recent call-ups 
The following players have also been called up for the team's stage within the last two months.

Players born outside Sicily

List by country of birth

Sicilian footballers who represented FIFA national teams

Sicilian heritage 
There are many other international footballers with some Sicilian heritage or connection, for example:

Fixtures and results 
This is a list of results for the matches played since 2022, including friendly matches against full FIFA international teams and others against fellow representative teams which are not aligned to FIFA and against professional or amateur clubs.

Anthem 
The Sicilia F.A. ha chosen  as official anthem the cabaletta Suoni la tromba from I puritani (1835) by Vincenzo Bellini.

Media partners 
A partnership between the Sicilia F.A. and the football TV WeSport.it was announced through the social media on 2 June 2021.

Management and Staff

See also 
 Sicily men's national futsal team

References

External links 
  Sicilia FA official website
  Sicily – CONIFA official website
 Sicilia FA Instagram Page
 Sicilia FA Twitter Page

 
Football teams in Italy
national
CONIFA member associations
European national and official selection-teams not affiliated to FIFA